Işıkları Söndürseler Bile (English: Even If They Turn Off the Lights)  is the fourth album by Turkish rock band maNga. It was released by Poll Production in April 2014.

Track listing

Notes

References 

2014 albums
Manga (band) albums